The Rose of Tralee International Festival is an event which is celebrated among Irish communities all over the world.  The festival, held annually in the town of Tralee in County Kerry, takes its inspiration from a 19th-century ballad of the same name about a woman called Mary, who because of her beauty was called "The Rose of Tralee". The words of the song are credited to C. (or E.) Mordaunt Spencer and the music to Charles William Glover, but a story circulated in connection with the festival claims that the song was written by William Pembroke Mulchinock, a wealthy Protestant, out of love for Mary O'Connor, a poor Catholic maid in service to his parents.

History
The festival has its origins in the local Carnival Queen, once an annual town event, fallen by the wayside due to post-war emigration. In 1957, the Race Week Carnival was resurrected in Tralee, and it featured a Carnival Queen. The idea for the festival came when a group of local business people met in Harty's bar, Tralee to come up with ideas to bring more tourists to the town during the horse racing meeting and to encourage expats to return to their native Tralee. Led by Dan Nolan, then Managing Director of The Kerryman newspaper, they hit on the idea of the Rose of Tralee Festival. The event started in 1959 on a budget of £750.

The founders of the organisation were Billy Clifford, an accountant with the Rank Organisation, who was one of the first recipients of the Golden Rose award (which was inaugurated to celebrate the 10th anniversary of the Festival of Kerry); Dan Nolan, involved with the Tralee Races; Jo Hussey, a shopkeeper in Tralee; and Ted Keane Snr, a local restaurateur.

Originally, only women from Tralee were eligible to take part. In the early 1960s it was extended to include any women from Kerry, and in 1967 it was further extended to include any women of Irish birth or ancestry. Recent winners have included women of mixed heritage: Mindy O'Sullivan (Filipina-Irish), Tara Talbot (Filipina-Irish), Clare Kambamettu (Indian-Irish) and Kirsten Mate Maher (Zambian-Irish). On winning the title in 2018 Maher said "There is no 'typical Irish woman'. We're all different and we all come in all shapes and sizes and skin colours... We're such a diverse community, and we need to embrace that".

In 2004 the Rose of Tralee Regional Finals were introduced to offer more people an opportunity to participate in the Rose of Tralee International Festival. It was held every year until 2015 in Portlaoise, Co. Laois on the June Bank Holiday weekend.

In the inaugural Regional Final, fourteen women competed for three places in the Rose of Tralee International Festival in August. It became bigger each year and in 2015 the Regional Finals brought together 56 Roses from the United States, Ireland, Britain, Europe, Canada and the United Arab Emirates. Over three selection nights, seven Irish Roses and sixteen International Roses were then selected to progress and join the other 9 Roses at the Rose of Tralee International Festival in August.

From 2004 to 2015, the number of Rose Centres grew to more than 65. In 2014 it was announced that the 2015 Regional Finals would be the last, in favour of a revamped selection process held in Tralee.

The 2020 and 2021 events were cancelled due to the restrictions in place to address the COVID-19 pandemic in Ireland. In December 2021, it was announced that the festival would return in 2022.

In December 2021, it was also announced by Anthony O'Gara that married women and transgender women can enter for the Rose of Tralee, and that the maximum age limit had increased to 29 years of age.

Modern practice
The Rose of Tralee festival is held every August in Tralee, County Kerry, to choose a young woman to be crowned the Rose. The winner is the woman deemed best to match the attributes relayed in the song: "lovely and fair". She is selected on the basis of personality and should be a good role-model for the festival and ambassador for Ireland during her travels around the world. It is not a beauty pageant and the participants (Roses) are not judged on their appearances but on their personality and suitability to serve as ambassadors for the festival. The festival bills itself as a celebration of the "aspirations, ambitions, intellect, social responsibility and Irish heritage" of modern young women.

Each of the 32 counties of the island of Ireland selects a Rose, and the international Roses, chosen from around the world, also participate in the qualifying rounds now staged in the Festival Dome in Tralee. Ultimately, 32 Roses are selected to appear in the televised selection finals on RTÉ One, out of whom one is crowned the Rose of Tralee.

The selection, which is broadcast over two nights by RTÉ, has been hosted by Dáithí Ó Sé since 2010. It was previously presented for 17 years by Gay Byrne. Other previous presenters include Terry Wogan, Brendan O'Reilly, Michael Twomey, Kathleen Watkins, Ray D'Arcy, Ryan Tubridy, Marty Whelan and Derek Davis. The first presenter of The Rose of Tralee (before it was televised) was Kevin Hilton.

The festival overcame financial difficulties in 2004, and has strengthened with growing visitor numbers and maintaining strong viewer figures.

The maximum age for women is 29 years of age. Married women are also eligible to enter as of December 2021. Until the year 2008, unmarried mothers were not allowed to enter the contest.

Men also participate in the show in the form of Rose Escorts, who assist the Roses during their time in the festival. The escort who works hardest is named "Escort of the Year", and is invited back to the festival the following year.

Media portrayals
The Channel 4 comedy Father Ted parodied the festival in the episode "Rock-a-Hula Ted" where the eponymous character is asked to host the local "Lovely Girls" competition. Will Scally produced and directed a Channel Four documentary called Rose of Tralee.

Commemoration
To celebrate the 50th anniversary of the festival in 2009, 50 Roses took part in the 2009 competition; usually there are around 30.

In 2014, Maria Walsh revealed that she was gay after winning.

Michele McCormack (1985 Chicago Rose) has gone on to win an Edward R. Murrow Award in her chosen profession of broadcast journalism. She hosts selection contests in Philadelphia and in the Midwest of the USA. (She credits her interview technique to Gay Byrne, who hosted the contest when she was in Tralee.) Other notable Roses include Aoife Mulholland of Galway (2003) who went on to achieve acclaim as an actor, and Noreen Culhane (New York Rose 1970) now Executive Vice-President of the New York Stock Exchange.

Gabby Logan, the BBC TV sports presenter, was the Leeds Rose in 1991.

Winners 1959–present

See also
 The Rose of Tralee (song)

References
Channel Four Television, Rose of Tralee, featuring Gay Byrne, narrator Henry Kelly, directed by Will Scally, correction to previous notification.

External links

 
 
 
 

 
Annual events in Ireland
Beauty pageants in Ireland
Recurring events established in 1959